Letrozole, sold under the brand name Femara among others, is an aromatase inhibitor medication that is used in the treatment of breast cancer.

It was patented in 1986 and approved for medical use in 1996. In 2020, it was the 257th most commonly prescribed medication in the United States, with more than 1million prescriptions.

Medical uses

Breast cancer

Letrozole is approved by the United States Food and Drug Administration (FDA) for the treatment of local or metastatic breast cancer that is hormone receptor positive or has an unknown receptor status in postmenopausal women.

Comparison with tamoxifen
Tamoxifen is also used to treat hormonally-responsive breast cancer, but it does so by interfering with the estrogen receptor. However, letrozole is effective only in post-menopausal women, in whom estrogen is produced predominantly in peripheral tissues (i.e. in adipose tissue, like that of the breast) and a number of sites in the brain. In pre-menopausal women, the main source of estrogen is from the ovaries not the peripheral tissues, and letrozole is ineffective.

In the BIG 1–98 Study, of post-menopausal women with hormonally-responsive breast cancer, letrozole reduced the recurrence of cancer, but did not change survival rate, compared to tamoxifen.

Ovulation induction

Letrozole has been used for ovulation induction by fertility doctors since 2001, because it has fewer side-effects than clomiphene (Clomid) and less chance of multiple gestation. A study of 150 babies following treatment with either letrozole alone or letrozole and gonadotropins presented at the American Society of Reproductive Medicine 2005 Conference found no difference in overall abnormalities but did find a significantly higher rate of locomotor and cardiac abnormalities among the group having taken letrozole compared to natural conception. A larger, follow-up study with 911 babies compared those born following treatment with letrozole to those born following treatment with clomiphene. That study also found no significant difference in the rate of overall abnormalities, but found that congenital cardiac anomalies was significantly higher in the clomiphene group compared to the letrozole group. Despite this, India banned the usage of letrozole in 2011, citing potential risks to infants. In 2012, an Indian parliamentary committee said that the drug controller office colluded with letrozole's makers to approve the drug for infertility in India and also stated that letrozole's use for infertility was illegal worldwide; however, such off-label uses are legal in many countries such as the US and UK.

Contraindications
Letrozole is contraindicated in women having a pre-menopausal hormonal status, during pregnancy and lactation.

Side effects
The most common side effects are sweating, hot flashes, arthralgia (joint pain), and fatigue.

Generally, side effects include signs and symptoms of hypoestrogenism. There is concern that long term use may lead to osteoporosis, which is why in certain patient populations such as post-menopausal women or osteoporotics, bisphosphonates may also be prescribed.

Interactions 

Letrozole inhibits the liver enzyme CYP2A6, and to a lesser extent CYP2C19, in vitro, but no relevant interactions with drugs like cimetidine and warfarin have been observed.

Pharmacology

Pharmacodynamics
Letrozole is an orally active, nonsteroidal, selective aromatase inhibitor and hence an antiestrogen. It prevents aromatase from producing estrogens by competitive, reversible binding to the heme of its cytochrome P450 unit. The action is specific, and letrozole does not reduce production of corticosteroids.

Research 
The antiestrogen action of letrozole has been shown to be useful in pretreatment for termination of pregnancy, in combination with misoprostol. It can be used in place of mifepristone, which is expensive and unavailable in many countries.

Letrozole is sometimes used as a treatment for gynecomastia, although it is probably most effective at this if caught in an early stage (such as in users of anabolic steroids).

Some studies have shown that letrozole can be used to promote spermatogenesis in male patients with nonobstructive azoospermia.

Letrozole has also been shown to delay the fusing of the growth plates in mice. When used in combination with growth hormone, letrozole has been shown effective in one adolescent boy with a short stature.

Letrozole has also been used to treat endometriosis.

Endometrial stromal sarcomas are hormonally sensitive tumors as it is represented that letrozole reduces serum estrogen levels. Letrozole is well-tolerated and is a good option for long-term management of this disease. Also in a study on Uterine myoma the volume was successfully reduced by use of an aromatase inhibitor. Rapid onset of action and avoidance of initial gonadotropin flare with an aromatase inhibitor.

Letrozole has been documented to be safe and effective for improving height and pubertal outcomes in children living with constitutional delay in growth and puberty, and is better than testosterone with regards to improvement in testicular volume and delaying bone-age progression. This was documented in a meta-analysis published by Dutta et al. which analyzed data from 7 different randomized controlled trials.

References

External links 
 

Aromatase inhibitors
Benzonitriles
Hormonal antineoplastic drugs
Novartis brands
Triazoles
World Anti-Doping Agency prohibited substances